This is a list of museums in Togo.

List 

 La Ville Mon Musée
 Musée Agbedigo Gaston
 Musée Geologique National
 Musée National du Togo
 Musée Régional d'Aného
 Musée Régional de Kara
 Musée Régional des Savanes
 Musée Régional du Centre, Sokode

See also 
 List of museums

External links 
 Museums in Togo

 
Togo
Museums
Museums
Togo